People with the name Mary Louise include:

 Mary Louise Boehm
 Mary Louise Booth	
 Mary Louise Brooks, dancer and actress
 Marylouise Burke, actress
 Mary Louise Curtis Bok Zimbalist
 Mary Louise Defender Wilson
 Mary Louise Graffam
 Mary Louise Gribble, also Joan Barry
 Mary Louise Guinan, also "Texas" Guinan
 Mary Louise Hancock
 Mary Louise Hurley, also Mary Louise Jenkins
 Mary Louise Kelly
 Mary Louise Lester	
 Mary Louise McLaughlin	
 Mary Louise Milliken Childs
 Mary-Louise Parker, actress
 Mary Louise Peebles	
 Mary Louise Perlman
 Mary Louise Pratt	
 Mary Louise Preis	
 Mary Louise Rasmuson
 Mary Louise Roberts
 Mary Louise Smith (disambiguation)
 Mary Louise Smith (Republican Party leader)
 Mary Louise Smith (civil rights activist)
 Mary Louise Snowden
 Mary Louise St. John
 Mary Louise Streep, better known as Meryl Streep
 Mary Louise Tobin
 Mary Louise Weller
 Mary Louise White Aswell, one of the four people who wrote detective fiction under the pen name Patrick Quentin
 Mary Louise Wilson	
 Mary Louise Wright

See also

 Mary Louise (disambiguation)
 Marie Louise (disambiguation)
 Maria Louisa
 Mary Louisa
 Mary Lou (name)
 Marylou (disambiguation)
 Marilu
 
 
 
 
 Mary (given name)
 Louise (given name)

Compound given names